The Phelps Farm Historic District encompasses a collection of farm and residential properties on Connecticut Route 183 and Prock Hill Road in Colebrook, Connecticut.  This area is a virtually intact mid-19th century farmstead, with its land under a single family's ownership since the 18th century.  The district was listed on the National Register of Historic Places in 1983.

Description and history
The property is bounded on the west and south by Sandy Brook, and extends onto the east side of CT 183 and Prock Hill Road, where some of the district buildings are located. Most notable of these is the Arah Phelps Inn, at the junction of the two roads, a fine Federal period house that was also operated by the family as a tavern. On the west side is the Greek Revival house of Edward Phelps, along with a number of 19th century outbuildings. Most of the farm is open pastureland.

The farm's history really begins in the 1780s, when Arah Phelps dammed Sandy Brook and built a sawmill. He and his father Josiah built the inn in 1793, and it soon became the center of a small community. The inn was an economic success as the road (now CT 183) was part of the stagecoach route between Hartford, Connecticut and Albany, New York. In addition to operating the tavern and mill, Arah also sold his own farm products at the inn. His son Edward took over the property in the 1830s, and it is during his ownership that many of the surviving farm buildings were constructed. In addition to the new family house, he also built a fine Gothic Revival cottage as housing for farm hands.

See also
National Register of Historic Places listings in Litchfield County, Connecticut

References

Historic districts on the National Register of Historic Places in Connecticut
National Register of Historic Places in Litchfield County, Connecticut
Greek Revival architecture in Connecticut
Gothic Revival architecture in Connecticut
Colebrook, Connecticut